MicroLeague Wrestling is a professional wrestling simulation video game, the first based on the World Wrestling Federation (WWF), released in 1987 for Commodore 64 and Atari ST and in 1989 for Amiga and DOS. It was developed by MicroLeague and published by MicroLeague. The game is part of the company's MicroLeague sports series, which included MicroLeague Baseball.

In contrast to most action-oriented wrestling games, the gameplay in MicroLeague Wrestling involves turn-based strategy. Players select one of several pre-set matches and choose their wrestler's actions via a menu. Wrestlers are depicted using digitized photographs from actual matches.

Gameplay
The game uses turn-based strategy, as players choose a move from their wrestler's arsenal as their opponent does the same, and depending on the situation, one move will successfully be done. Each wrestler has five "basic" moves (which cause two damage points), four "major" moves (which cause four damage points), and one "super" move (which causes six damage points and is the only way to attempt to pin the opponent). Each wrestler also has a block option, which if done successfully will remove two of their own damage points. In addition, face wrestlers can attempt a special move in which they rally the crowd to gain momentum and recover some of their damage. Heel wrestlers can attempt special cheating tactics, but this runs the risk of disqualification.

The moves and scenes in the game's matches are accompanied by digitized images of them occurring from each specific match. The original MicroLeague Wrestling disk, released in 1987, features Hulk Hogan vs. Randy "Macho Man" Savage on one side and Hulk Hogan vs. "Mr. Wonderful" Paul Orndorff on the other. In 1988, two expansion discs were released, known as the "WWF Superstar Series." The first of these features Randy Savage vs. The Honky Tonk Man and Hacksaw Jim Duggan vs. King Harley Race. The second disk features Hulk Hogan vs. "Million Dollar Man" Ted DiBiase and Jake "The Snake" Roberts vs. Ravishing Rick Rude. The Amiga and DOS versions, released in 1989, feature Hogan vs. Savage (from a later match between them) and Hogan vs. DiBiase. There were no expansions released for this version as the WWF ceased production of the game to focus on console games.

Before the matches, Mean Gene Okerlund interviews the participants. Howard Finkel does ring introductions. During the matches, text commentary is provided by Vince McMahon and either Jesse "The Body" Ventura or Bruno Sammartino. The expansion disks as well as the later versions of the game feature the teams of McMahon and Ventura and Gorilla Monsoon with either Bobby "The Brain" Heenan or Lord Alfred Hayes.

See also

 List of licensed wrestling video games
 List of fighting games

References

External links
MicroLeague Wrestling at GameFAQs

1987 video games
Amiga games
Atari ST games
Commodore 64 games
DOS games
WWE video games
Multiplayer and single-player video games
Video games developed in the United States
Professional wrestling games
MicroLeague games